The angle of arrival (AoA) of a signal is the direction from which the signal (e.g. radio, optical or acoustic) is received.

Measurement
Measurement of AoA can be done by determining the direction of propagation of a radio-frequency wave incident on an antenna array or determined from maximum signal strength during antenna rotation.

The AoA can be calculated by measuring the time difference of arrival (TDOA) between individual elements of the array.

Generally this TDOA measurement is made by measuring the difference in received phase at each element in the antenna array.  This can be thought of as beamforming in reverse.  In beamforming, the signal from each element is weighed to "steer" the gain of the antenna array.  In AoA, the delay of arrival at each element is measured directly and converted to an AoA measurement.

Consider, for example, a two element array spaced apart by one-half the wavelength of an incoming RF wave.  If a wave is incident upon the array at boresight, it will arrive at each antenna simultaneously.  This will yield 0° phase-difference measured between the two antenna elements, equivalent to a 0° AoA.  If a wave is incident upon the array at broadside, then a 180° phase difference will be measured between the elements, corresponding to a 90° AoA.

In optics, AoA can be calculated using interferometry.

Applications
An application of AoA is in the geolocation of cell phones. The aim is either for the cell system to report the location of a cell phone placing an emergency call or to provide a service to tell the user of the cell phone where they are.  Multiple receivers on a base station would calculate the AoA of the cell phone's signal, and this information would be combined to determine the phone's location.

AoA is generally used to discover the location of pirate radio stations or of any military radio transmitter.

In submarine acoustics, AoA is used to localize objects with active or passive ranging.

Limitation
Limitations on the accuracy of estimation of angle of arrival signals in digital antenna arrays are associated with jitter ADC and DAC.

See also
 Geolocation
 GNSS
 GSM localization
 Multilateration
 Radiolocation
 Time of arrival
 Triangulation
 Trilateration
 Wideband Space Division Multiple Access
 Direction finding

References

Angle
Signal processing